After Sex is a 1997 film by French director Brigitte Roüan.

Roüan stars in the film as Diane Clovier, a married mother of two who has an affair with the friend of a young writer she is mentoring. Meanwhile, her husband, a lawyer, is defending a woman charged with murdering her unfaithful spouse.

The film was well received in its native France, but raised some eyebrows for its sympathetic treatment of a woman's infidelity. The film also received positive notice in the United States, where it was released in 1998. It was screened in the Un Certain Regard section at the 1997 Cannes Film Festival.

The original French title, literally "After Coitus, Sad Animal", alludes to post-coital tristesse.

Cast
Brigitte Roüan as Diane Clovier
Patrick Chesnais as Philippe Clovier
Boris Terral as Emilio
Nils Tavernier as François Narou
Jean-Louis Richard as Weyoman-Lebeau
Françoise Arnoul as Madame LePluche
Emmanuelle Bach as Caroline
Carmen Chaplin as Copine Narou
Gaëlle Le Fur as Isabelle
Elodie Pong as Designer
Roberto Plate as Miguel
Olivier Lechat as Victor
Félix Dedet-Roüan as Basile
Jean Delavalade as Dedé
Jean-Claude Chapuis as Musical Classes Player

Reception
On review aggregator website Rotten Tomatoes the film has a score of 74% based on reviews from 18 critics, with an average rating of 6.4/10.

Steve Davis of The Austin Chronicle gave the film 3 stars out of 5, while Sandra Brennan AllMovie gives it 2 stars out of 5.

Roger Ebert of the Chicago Sun-Times gave it 3 stars out of 4 and stated that "By the end of the film, we have come to admire Rouan's courage as a performer and a filmmaker, in following Diane's mania as far as it will go".

References

Sources

External links

1997 drama films
Films directed by Brigitte Roüan
French drama films
1990s French-language films
Adultery in films
1990s French films